Panama City Beach is a resort town in Bay County, Florida, United States, on the Gulf of Mexico coast. As of the 2010 census it had a population of 12,018. The city is often referred to under the umbrella term of "Panama City". Panama City Beach's slogan is "The World's Most Beautiful Beaches" due to the unique, sugar-white sandy beaches of northwest Florida.

Panama City Beach is a popular vacation destination, especially among people in the Southern United States. The town is also a popular spring break destination, due to its beach and proximity to most of the Southern United States. The first two seasons of MTV's Floribama Shore were filmed in the town.

History

Real estate boom
A construction boom in the early to mid-2000s changed the image of the area due to the older homes and motels being replaced with high-rise condominiums and more expansive homes. However, this is turning unobstructed, low-rise beach views and affordable waterfront property into rarities. At the peak of the real estate boom, many beachfront properties had quadrupled or more in value since 2000. In November 2006 CNN/Money named Panama City Beach the No. 1 real estate market in America for the next five years in. Beachfront property has sold for upwards of $60,000 per "front foot" (linear foot) at the top of the market. The downturn in the U.S. real estate market in 2007, combined with a surge of new condo construction, brought spiraling prices somewhat under control. With the real estate boom, Panama City Beach became a well known destination for spring break.

Category 5 Hurricane Michael made landfall near Mexico Beach in Bay County on October 10, 2018, becoming one of the strongest and most-destructive hurricanes in American history as it destroyed a large part of the county, including many structures in Mexico Beach and Panama City.
An EF-0 tornado did minor damage to the northwest part of Panama City Beach, Florida on February 15.

Geography
Panama City Beach is located at  (30.207362, −85.851485).

The city is located in the panhandle on the Gulf of Mexico. The main roads through the city are U.S. Route 98 and Florida State Road 30. US 98 runs from northwest to southeast just inland from the coast, leading east  to Panama City and northwest  to Destin. FL-30 runs along the coast from northwest to southeast as Front Beach Rd, leading east to Panama City and northwest  to Rosemary Beach.

According to the United States Census Bureau, the city has a total area of —  is land and  (1.17%) is water.

Demographics

As of the census of 2010, there were 12,018 people, 5,417 households, and 3,068 families residing in the city. The racial makeup of the city was 89.5% White, 2.3% African American, 0.6% American Indian or Alaska Native, 2.7% Asian and 3.1% from two or more races. Hispanic or Latino of any race were 5.8% of the population.

There were 5,417 households, out of which 21.1% had children under the age of 18 living with them, 42.9% were headed by married couples living together, 9.2% had a female householder with no husband present, and 43.4% were non-families. 31.3% of all households were made up of individuals, and 9.5% were someone living alone who was 65 years of age or older. The average household size was 2.22, and the average family size was 2.76.

In the city, the population was spread out, with 18.0% under the age of 18, 10.3% from 18 to 24, 27.2% from 25 to 44, 29.0% from 45 to 64, and 15.5% who were 65 years of age or older. The median age was 40.9 years. For every 100 females, there were 99.6 males. For every 100 females age 18 and over, there were 100.0 males.

Ancestries: English (17.7%), German (17.4%), Irish (14.8%), United States (11.1%), Italian (3.6%), French (3.1%).

At the 2000 census, the median income for a household in the city was $41,198, and the median income for a family was $49,127. Males had a median income of $32,459 versus $22,358 for females. The per capita income for the city was $26,734. About 2.2% of families and 5.0% of the population were below the poverty line, including 3.9% of those under age 18 and 4.5% of those age 65 or over.

Government
The City of Panama City Beach has a council–manager government. The Mayor sits as a Council member-at-large and presides over City Council meetings. If the Mayor cannot preside over a City Council meeting, then the Vice Mayor is the presiding officer of the meeting until the Mayor returns to his seat. The City Manager is responsible for the administration and the day-to-day operation of all of the municipal services and city departments. The City Manager also maintains intergovernmental relationships with federal, state, county and other local governments.

The primary law enforcement agency in the city is the Panama City Beach Police Department. Part of the city is in unincorporated Bay County and is under the jurisdiction of the Bay County Sheriff's Office.

City council
 Mark Sheldon – Mayor (term expires in 2024)

Services 
 Panama City Beach Police Department
 Panama City Beach Fire Rescue

Education 
Primary and secondary public education is provided by the Bay District Schools (BDS).

The Gulf Coast State College is located in Panama City, just across the Hathaway Bridge from Panama City Beach.

The Florida State University Panama City branch campus is also located in Panama City, just across the Hathaway Bridge from Panama City Beach.

Transportation
The new Northwest Florida Beaches International Airport provides commercial flights into the area. The airport serves private aircraft, domestic passenger flights, and freight/cargo flights. It is the first international airport to be constructed after the September 11 terrorist attacks. Other modes of transportation include scooters, which can be rented by the day, as well as taxi and shuttle companies, which are permitted by the local police.

Panama City Beach also has a road trolley system available which runs hourly. The Bay Town Trolley system runs throughout the county giving its tourists and locals the resource they need to get around Bay County.

Major highways
 US 98 is an east–west highway running along the Gulf Coast. It is the main route to Destin and to Panama City proper.
 State Road 79 is a north–south highway that starts in Panama City Beach and heads north to Interstate 10 and on to the Alabama state line.
 State Road 30, formerly US 98 Alt, also named Front Beach Road, is an east–west highway that runs mostly along the beach front, beginning and ending at US 98.

Sports 
The city was home to the Panama City Beach Pirates, a fourth-division soccer team from 2007 to 2015.

It is also notable that World Championship Wrestling held their last WCW Nitro event in Panama City Beach. WCW was bought out by their rival competition WWF (now WWE).

Recreation
Frank Brown Park

Gallery

In popular culture
 Panama City Beach is the setting for the 2015 film Dancin': It's On!
 Thunder Beach Motorcycle Rally

References

External links

Official website
Panama City Beach Convention and Visitors Bureau

 
Cities in Bay County, Florida
Populated coastal places in Florida on the Gulf of Mexico
Seaside resorts in Florida
Populated places established in 1977
Cities in Florida